Grant Reed (c. 1869 – 1942) was Mayor of Anchorage, Alaska from 1928–1929.

Biography
Reed moved to Skagway, Alaska in 1900 to work for the White Pass and Yukon Route
In 1908, he took a job with the Alaska Steamship Company, and later worked for the Copper River and Northwestern Railway in Cordova. Reed went to work for the Alaska Railroad in 1920. In 1921, he moved to Anchorage and opened a women's apparel store called Reed's with his wife, Sadie.

Reed was elected to two terms on the City Council, in 1923 and 1926.
In 1928, Reed was elected to a single term as Mayor of Anchorage. He continued to work concurrently for the railroad.

In 1936, Reed retired from the Alaska Railroad. A widower, he remarried in 1939. In 1940, he and his wife, Agnes Sayers of Ketchikan moved to Long Beach, California, where Reed died in 1942 at the age of 73.

References
 
 

1869 births
1942 deaths
Alaska city council members
Mayors of Anchorage, Alaska
People from the Municipality of Skagway Borough, Alaska
Place of birth missing